Maurice Sion (17 October 1927, Skopje – 17 April 2018, Vancouver) was an American and Canadian mathematician, specializing in measure theory and game theory. He is known for Sion's minimax theorem.

Biography

Sion received from New York University his B.A. in 1947 and his M.A. in 1948. He received from the University of California, Berkeley in 1951 his Ph.D. under the supervision of Anthony Morse with thesis On the existence of functions having given partial derivatives on Whitney's curve. Sion was a member of the mathematics faculty at U.C. Berkeley until 1960, when he immigrated to Canada with his wife Emilie and his two children born in the U.S.A. (His two younger children were born in Canada.) From 1960 until he retired in 1989, Maurice Sion was a professor of mathematics at the University of British Columbia. For two academic years from 1957 to 1959 and in the autumn of 1962 he was at the Institute for Advanced Study. He wrote several books on mathematics and served for many years as the head of the University of British Columbia's mathematics department. In 1957 he was the coauthor with Philip Wolfe of a paper with an example of a zero-sum game without a minimax value.  Sion was an Invited Speaker at the International Congress of Mathematicians (ICM) in 1970 in Nice and was appointed the Main Organizer for the ICM held in Vancouver in 1974. In 2012 he was elected a Fellow of the American Mathematical Society.

Sion was fluent in Spanish, Italian, French, and English.

He was predeceased by his youngest child. Upon his death he was survived by his widow, three children, and six grandchildren.

Selected publications

Articles
 
 
 with R. C. Willmott:

Books

References

1927 births
2018 deaths
People from Skopje
New York University alumni
University of California, Berkeley alumni
Academic staff of the University of British Columbia
American people of Sephardic-Jewish descent
20th-century American mathematicians
21st-century American mathematicians
20th-century Canadian mathematicians
21st-century Canadian mathematicians
Mathematical analysts
Measure theorists
Fellows of the American Mathematical Society